Glenwood, Oregon refers to the name of three different unincorporated communities in the U.S. state of Oregon.  They are:

Glenwood, Clatsop County, Oregon, a historic locale
Glenwood, Lane County, Oregon, a populated place
Glenwood, Washington County, Oregon, a populated place